Onitis subopacus is a species of dung beetle found in Austro-Oriental, Oriental, South and West Palearctic regions.

Distribution
It is found in India, Sri Lanka, Pakistan, Myanmar, Thailand, China, Afghanistan, Nepal, Vietnam, Cambodia and Sunda Islands.

Description
This oval, narrow and medium convex species has an average length of about 16 to 21 mm. Body black or pitchy-black with a slight metallic lustre. Head and prothorax moderately shiny but the elytra not shiny. Clypeus elliptical, finely transversely rugulose. Pronotum rather closely punctured. Elytra finely striate. Pygidium opaque and scarcely punctured. Metasternal shield smooth and shiny. Male has elongate, slender, and strongly curved front tibia. Female has short front tibia with four stout external teeth.

Adults are often found in cow dung and buffalo dung.

References 

Scarabaeinae
Beetles of Sri Lanka
Insects described in 1931